Snowball is a character in George Orwell's 1945 novel Animal Farm. He is largely based on Leon Trotsky, who led the opposition against Joseph Stalin (Napoleon). He is shown as a white pig on the movie poster for the 1999 film Animal Farm, and as a white pig in the 1954 film. Snowball is voiced by Maurice Denham and Kelsey Grammer in the 1954 and 1999 films, respectively.

Snowball's ideas

Snowball believes in a continued revolution: he argues that to defend Animal Farm, he must strengthen the reality of Old Major's dream of a life without humans and that they must stir up rebellions in other farms throughout England. However, Napoleon always disagrees with any ideas that Snowball has because he does not want Snowball to lead Animal Farm and gain more popularity than himself.

Snowball also writes the first version of the Seven Commandments. They are later altered by Squealer under the orders of Napoleon, to accommodate the actions of the pigs. For example, the commandment stating "No animal shall drink alcohol" is changed to "No animal shall drink alcohol to excess", and that which states "No animal shall sleep in a bed" has been changed to "No animal shall sleep in a bed with sheets". Another commandment, "No animal shall kill another animal" is changed to "No animal shall kill another animal without cause". Later all the commandments are replaced with one phrase: "All animals are equal, but some animals are more equal than others". The last alteration to the commandments is seen towards the end of the book where Benjamin (the donkey) reads out the Commandments to Clover (an old cart horse).

Snowball is eventually forced out of the farm when Napoleon uses his guard dogs to attack Snowball. After that, he is blamed for problems on the farm. It is believed that he was in support of Jones from the start as well as sowing seeds with weeds. Though he fought bravely at the Battle of the Cowshed, the facts are altered to say he openly fought for Jones and that the shot wounds are changed to wounds Napoleon inflicted on him. Those accused of supporting him are executed after being forced to confess, and a reward is offered for his capture.

Snowball is an inventive pig who influences others to his side with intelligence and compassion. It is never revealed what happens to him after his escape. In the 1954 animated adaptation it is implied that the dogs kill him. However, in the 1999 live-action film adaption, he is shown escaping the dogs and surviving, though Napoleon declares him banished under pain of death.

CIA-made character changes
When the novel Animal Farm was adapted for the screen in the 1950s, the CIA investors were initially greatly concerned that Snowball was presented too sympathetically in early script treatments and that Batchelor's script implied Snowball was "intelligent, dynamic, courageous". A memo declared that Snowball must be presented as a "fanatic intellectual whose plans if carried through would have led to disaster no less complete than under Napoleon." De Rochemont subsequently implemented these changes.

References

Fictional politicians
Animal Farm characters
Cultural depictions of Leon Trotsky
Literary characters introduced in 1945
Fictional revolutionaries
Fictional pigs
Fictional characters based on real people
Pigs in literature
Male characters in literature